L'Observateur de Monaco is a monthly news magazine in Monaco.

History
The magazine was established as a weekly magazine in 2005. Catherine Boniffassi was the first editor-in-chief. 

By 2007, it became a monthly magazine.

Ownership 
L'Observateur de Monaco was first owned by Enrico Braggiotti, then later by Patrice Pastor. 

It was acquired by Maurice Cohen in January 2010.

By August 2010, it was acquired by Antonio Caroli through his Caroli Group.

References

External links
 Official website

2005 establishments in Monaco
French-language magazines
Magazines established in 2005
Mass media in Monaco
Monthly magazines
News magazines published in Europe
Weekly magazines